The  Arizona Rattlers season marked the 3rd season for the franchise, and was highlighted by a victory in ArenaBowl VIII.

Regular season

Schedule

Standings

z – clinched homefield advantage

y – clinched division title

x – clinched playoff spot

Playoffs

Awards

References

External links
1994 Arizona Rattlers on ArenaFan.com

Arizona Rattlers seasons
1994 Arena Football League season
Arizona Rattlers Season, 1994
20th century in Phoenix, Arizona
ArenaBowl champion seasons